Sir Henry Foley Knight KCSI CIE (b. 19 January 1886 - d. 1960) was a British administrator and civil servant who served as the Acting Governor of Madras in 1946.

Early life 

Henry Foley Knight was born to John Henry Knight and Elizabeth Bligh Foley in Farnham on 19January 1886. He graduated from Caius College, Cambridge and in 1909, passed the Indian Civil Service examinations.

Career 

In 1910, Foley was sent to India as an Assistant Collector and Magistrate in Bombay Presidency. He served in the army during the First World War and as an Indian Army Reserve Officer from 1916 to 1919. Between 1919 and 1920, Foley served as an Under Secretary and then, Deputy Secretary of the Revenue and Financial Department of the Government of Bombay.

From 1939 to 1945, he served as Adviser to the Governor of Bombay Presidency in charge of finance, food, agriculture, and rural development. Returning to Great Britain in 1947, he served as Adviser to the Secretary of State for India.

Family 

Knight married Jesse Spence Duncan in 1926 and had one son and one daughter.

References

External links 
 

1886 births
1960 deaths
Companions of the Order of the Indian Empire
Knights Commander of the Order of the Star of India
Indian Civil Service (British India) officers
People educated at Haileybury and Imperial Service College
Alumni of Gonville and Caius College, Cambridge